Bourgawich Branch is a stream in Washington County in the U.S. state of Missouri. A tributary of Mineral Fork, it was named after an early settler of German ancestry.

See also
List of rivers of Missouri

References

Rivers of Washington County, Missouri
Rivers of Missouri